Beijing Shougang may refer to:
 Shougang Group, a Chinese conglomerate based in Beijing
 Beijing Shougang Co., Ltd., listed arm of the group
 The Beijing Ducks basketball team of the Chinese Basketball Association
 The Beijing Great Wall basketball team of the Women's Chinese Basketball Association
 The Beijing Kuanli F.C., during the time that the group sponsored the team and the team used the company name "Beijing Shougang" as part of its team name